James Campbell may refer to:

Academics
 James Archibald Campbell (1862–1934), founder of Campbell University in North Carolina
 James Marshall Campbell (1895–1977), dean of the college of arts and sciences at the Catholic University of America
 James Campbell (historian) (1935–2016), British academic specialising in Anglo-Saxon studies
 James E. Campbell (academic), American political scientist

Business
 James Campbell (industrialist) (1826–1900), Hawaii industrialist
 James Campbell (Australian timber merchant) (1830–1904), Australian timber merchant
 James Dykes Campbell (1839–1895), Scottish merchant and writer
 James Anson Campbell (1854–1933), American businessman with Youngstown Sheet and Tube Company
 James P. Campbell (fl. 2000s), president and CEO of GE Consumer & Industrial

Entertainment
 James Campbell (artist) (1828–1893), English artist 
 James Edwin Campbell (poet) (1867–1896), African-American poet, editor, writer and educator
 Blind James Campbell (1906–1981), American blues singer and guitarist
 James Campbell (clarinetist) (born 1949), Canadian/American clarinetist
 James Campbell (author) (born 1951), Scottish writer
 James Campbell (comedian), children's comedian in the UK
 James B. Campbell, percussionist, author
 James Campbell (actor), English actor in Oh No It Isn't!
 Jim Campbell (comics) (born 1977), U.S. comics artist

Military
 James Campbell, 1st Earl of Irvine, Lord Kintyre (1610–1645), colonel of the Garde Écossaise and son of Archibald Campbell, 7th Earl of Argyll
 James Campbell (officer of arms), Lord Lyon King of Arms, 1658–1660
 James Campbell (British Army officer, died 1745) (c. 1680–1745), Scottish officer of the British Army
 James Campbell (British Army officer, died 1831) (1745–1831), British Army officer
 James Campbell (land commissioner) (1787–1858), British Army officer and Commissioner of Crown Lands in Canterbury, New Zealand
 James Campbell (Royal Marines officer) (1761–1840)
 Sir James Campbell, 1st Baronet (1763–1819), British Army officer
 James A. Campbell (Medal of Honor) (1844–1904), American Civil War soldier
 James L. Campbell (born 1949), American soldier

Media
 James Campbell (journalist) Australian political journalist

Politics

Australia
 James Campbell (New South Wales politician) (1820–1879), member of the NSW Legislative Assembly 1864–1874 for Morpeth
 James Campbell (Queensland politician) (1838–1925), member of the Queensland Legislative Assembly
 James Callender Campbell (1838–1916), member of the Victorian Legislative Council (South Eastern) 1895–1910
 James Campbell (Victorian politician) (1845–1893), member of the Victorian Legislative Council (Wellington) 1882–1886, Assembly 1982–93

U.K. 
 James Cambell (1570–1642), ironmonger and Lord Mayor of London
 James Campbell (of Burnbank and Boquhan) (c. 1660–c. 1713), MP for Ayr Burghs
 Sir James Campbell, 2nd Baronet, of Ardkinglass (1666–1752), British MP for Argyllshire and Stirlingshire
 James Campbell (1737–1805), Scottish MP for Stirling Burghs
 James Campbell of Stracathro (1790–1876) Scottish businessman and politician, father of Henry Campbell-Bannerman and James Alexander Campbell 
 James Alexander Campbell (politician) (1825–1908), Scottish MP for Glasgow and Aberdeen Universities and Privy Councillor
 James Campbell, 1st Baron Glenavy (1851–1931), Irish Solicitor-General, Attorney-General and Lord Chancellor
 James Campbell (British Army officer, died 1835) (c. 1773–1835), governor of British Ceylon, 1822–1824

U.S. 
 James Campbell (postmaster general) (1812–1893), US postmaster general
 James Campbell (Wisconsin politician) (1814–1883), member of the Wisconsin State Assembly
 James E. Campbell (1843–1924), Democratic politician from Ohio
 James Hepburn Campbell (1820–1895), U.S. Representative from Pennsylvania 
 James J. Campbell, American politician from Maine
 James M. Campbell, member of the Wisconsin State Assembly
 James R. Campbell (Illinois politician) (1853–1924), U.S. Representative from Illinois
 James R. Campbell (Arkansas politician) (1893–1981), member of the Arkansas House of Representatives
 James U. Campbell (1866–1937), 25th Chief Justice of the Oregon Supreme Court
 James V. Campbell (1823–1890), member of the Michigan Supreme Court from 1858 to 1890
 James W. Campbell (born 1947), member of the Maryland House of Delegates

Sports
 James Campbell (English cricketer) (born 1988), English cricketer
 James Campbell (English footballer) (fl. 1910/11), English goalkeeper (Huddersfield Town)
 James Campbell (footballer, born 1869) (1869–1938), Scottish footballer (Kilmarnock FC and Scotland)
 James Campbell (javelin thrower) (born 1988), Scottish javelin thrower
 James Campbell (New Zealand cricketer) (fl. 1868/69), New Zealand cricketer
 James Campbell (rugby union) (1858–1902), Canadian rugby player
 James Campbell (pole vaulter) (1901–1975), British Olympic athlete

Other
 James Campbell (British surgeon), 19th-century British surgeon, member of the Jones-Brydges mission to Iran
 James Colquhoun Campbell (1813–1895), Scottish-born Welsh Anglican Bishop of Bangor
 James G. Campbell (1811–1868), Justice of the Louisiana Supreme Court
 James Macnabb Campbell (1846–1903), Scottish administrator and ethnologist in India
 James Palmer Campbell (1855–1926), member of the New Zealand Legislative Council
 James Campbell (1789–1861), Scottish clergyman
 James Montgomery Campbell (1859–1937), Scottish clergyman
 James T. Campbell, American historian
 James Campbell (journalist) (fl. 2000s), Australian journalist
 James Campbell, 2nd Baronet, of Aberuchil, see Campbell baronets
 James Campbell, pseudonym of James Campbell Reddie (died 1878), author of pornography
 James Campbell (potter) (1943–2019), British potter
 James Campbell and Sons, a building materials company in Brisbane, Queensland, Australia

See also
 Irving King, pseudonym of the British songwriting team of Jimmy (James) Campbell and Reg Connelly
 Jim Campbell (disambiguation)
 Jimmy Campbell (disambiguation)
 Jamie Campbell (disambiguation)
 James Campbell High School
 James Edwin Campbell (disambiguation)